Lithophane grotei, commonly known as Grote's pinion or Grote's sallow, is a species of moth in the family Noctuidae. It was first described by Riley in 1882 and it is found in North America.

The MONA or Hodges number for Lithophane grotei is 9915.

References

Further reading

 
 
 
 
 
 

grotei
Moths described in 1882